Vorbe is a surname. Notable people with the surname include:

Fabien Vorbe (born 1990), Haitian footballer
Philippe Vorbe (born 1947), Haitian footballer
Sebastien Vorbe (born 1976), Haitian footballer, nephew of Philippe

See also
Vorbe grele, Romanian news television series